Ralph Machado Dias (born 7 March 1998), commonly known as Ralph, is a Brazilian footballer who plays for Ypiranga, on loan from Atlético Mineiro, as a midfielder.

Career statistics

Club

References

1998 births
Living people
Brazilian footballers
Association football midfielders
Campeonato Brasileiro Série A players
Campeonato Brasileiro Série B players
Campeonato Brasileiro Série D players
Clube Atlético Mineiro players
Criciúma Esporte Clube players
Boavista Sport Club players
Coimbra Esporte Clube players
Associação Ferroviária de Esportes players
Clube Náutico Capibaribe players
Ypiranga Futebol Clube players
People from São Fidélis